In probability theory and statistics, the chi-squared distribution (also chi-square or -distribution) with  degrees of freedom is the distribution of a sum of the squares of  independent standard normal random variables. The chi-squared distribution is a special case of the gamma distribution and is one of the most widely used probability distributions in inferential statistics, notably in hypothesis testing and in construction of confidence intervals. This distribution is sometimes called the central chi-squared distribution, a special case of the more general noncentral chi-squared distribution.

The chi-squared distribution is used in the common chi-squared tests for goodness of fit of an observed distribution to a theoretical one, the independence of two criteria of classification of qualitative data, and in confidence interval estimation for a population standard deviation of a normal distribution from a sample standard deviation. Many other statistical tests also use this distribution, such as Friedman's analysis of variance by ranks.

Definitions 
If  are independent, standard normal random variables, then the sum of their squares,
 
is distributed according to the chi-squared distribution with  degrees of freedom. This is usually denoted as
 

The chi-squared distribution has one parameter: a positive integer  that specifies the number of degrees of freedom (the number of random variables being summed, Zi s).

Introduction 

The chi-squared distribution is used primarily in hypothesis testing, and to a lesser extent for confidence intervals for population variance when the underlying distribution is normal. Unlike more widely known distributions such as the normal distribution and the exponential distribution, the chi-squared distribution is not as often applied in the direct modeling of natural phenomena. It arises in the following hypothesis tests, among others:

Chi-squared test of independence in contingency tables
Chi-squared test of goodness of fit of observed data to hypothetical distributions
Likelihood-ratio test for nested models
Log-rank test in survival analysis
Cochran–Mantel–Haenszel test for stratified contingency tables
Wald test
Score test

It is also a component of the definition of the t-distribution and the F-distribution used in t-tests, analysis of variance, and regression analysis.

The primary reason for which the chi-squared distribution is extensively used in hypothesis testing is its relationship to the normal distribution. Many hypothesis tests use a test statistic, such as the t-statistic in a t-test. For these hypothesis tests, as the sample size, increases, the sampling distribution of the test statistic approaches the normal distribution (central limit theorem). Because the test statistic (such as ) is asymptotically normally distributed, provided the sample size is sufficiently large, the distribution used for hypothesis testing may be approximated by a normal distribution. Testing hypotheses using a normal distribution is well understood and relatively easy. The simplest chi-squared distribution is the square of a standard normal distribution. So wherever a normal distribution could be used for a hypothesis test, a chi-squared distribution could be used.

Now, consider the random variable . The distribution of the random variable  is an example of a chi-squared distribution: . The subscript 1 indicates that this particular chi-squared distribution is constructed from only 1 standard normal distribution. A chi-squared distribution constructed by squaring a single standard normal distribution is said to have 1 degree of freedom. Thus, as the sample size for a hypothesis test increases, the distribution of the test statistic approaches a normal distribution. Just as extreme values of the normal distribution have low probability (and give small p-values), extreme values of the chi-squared distribution have low probability.

An additional reason that the chi-squared distribution is widely used is that it turns up as the large sample distribution of generalized likelihood ratio tests (LRT). LRTs have several desirable properties; in particular, simple LRTs commonly provide the highest power to reject the null hypothesis (Neyman–Pearson lemma) and this leads also to optimality properties of generalised LRTs. However, the normal and chi-squared approximations are only valid asymptotically. For this reason, it is preferable to use the t distribution rather than the normal approximation or the chi-squared approximation for a small sample size. Similarly, in analyses of contingency tables, the chi-squared approximation will be poor for a small sample size, and it is preferable to use Fisher's exact test. Ramsey shows that the exact binomial test is always more powerful than the normal approximation.

Lancaster shows the connections among the binomial, normal, and chi-squared distributions, as follows. De Moivre and Laplace established that a binomial distribution could be approximated by a normal distribution. Specifically they showed the asymptotic normality of the random variable

Squaring both sides of the equation gives

The expression on the right is of the form that Karl Pearson would generalize to the form

where

 = Pearson's cumulative test statistic, which asymptotically approaches a  distribution;
 = the number of observations of type ;
 = the number of cells in the table.

In the case of a binomial outcome (flipping a coin), the binomial distribution may be approximated by a normal distribution (for sufficiently large ). Because the square of a standard normal distribution is the chi-squared distribution with one degree of freedom, the probability of a result such as 1 heads in 10 trials can be approximated either by using the normal distribution directly, or the chi-squared distribution for the normalised, squared difference between observed and expected value. However, many problems involve more than the two possible outcomes of a binomial, and instead require 3 or more categories, which leads to the multinomial distribution. Just as de Moivre and Laplace sought for and found the normal approximation to the binomial, Pearson sought for and found a degenerate multivariate normal approximation to the multinomial distribution (the numbers in each category add up to the total sample size, which is considered fixed). Pearson showed that the chi-squared distribution arose from such a multivariate normal approximation to the multinomial distribution, taking careful account of the statistical dependence (negative correlations) between numbers of observations in different categories.

Probability density function 
The probability density function (pdf) of the chi-squared distribution is

where  denotes the gamma function, which has closed-form values for integer .

For derivations of the pdf in the cases of one, two and  degrees of freedom, see Proofs related to chi-squared distribution.

Cumulative distribution function 

Its cumulative distribution function is:
 

In a special case of  this function has the simple form:
 
which can be easily derived by integrating  directly. The integer recurrence of the gamma function makes it easy to compute  for other small, even .

Tables of the chi-squared cumulative distribution function are widely available and the function is included in many spreadsheets and all statistical packages.

Letting , Chernoff bounds on the lower and upper tails of the CDF may be obtained. For the cases when  (which include all of the cases when this CDF is less than half):

The tail bound for the cases when , similarly, is
 

For another approximation for the CDF modeled after the cube of a Gaussian, see under Noncentral chi-squared distribution.

Properties

Cochran's theorem 

If  are independent identically distributed (i.i.d.), standard normal random variables, then

where

Additivity 
It follows from the definition of the chi-squared distribution that the sum of independent chi-squared variables is also chi-squared distributed.

Sample mean 
The sample mean of  i.i.d. chi-squared variables of degree  is distributed according to a gamma distribution with shape  and scale  parameters:

Asymptotically, given that for a scale parameter  going to infinity, a Gamma distribution converges towards a normal distribution with expectation  and variance , the sample mean converges towards:

Entropy 
The differential entropy is given by
 
where  is the Digamma function.

Since the chi-squared is in the family of gamma distributions, this can be derived by substituting appropriate values in the Expectation of the log moment of gamma. For derivation from more basic principles, see the derivation in moment-generating function of the sufficient statistic.

Noncentral moments 
The moments about zero of a chi-squared distribution with  degrees of freedom are given by

Cumulants 
The cumulants are readily obtained by a (formal) power series expansion of the logarithm of the characteristic function:

Concentration 

The chi-squared distribution exhibits strong concentration around its mean. The standard Laurent-Massart  bounds are:

Asymptotic properties 

By the central limit theorem, because the chi-squared distribution is the sum of  independent random variables with finite mean and variance, it converges to a normal distribution for large . For many practical purposes, for  the distribution is sufficiently close to a normal distribution, so the difference is ignorable. Specifically, if , then as  tends to infinity, the distribution of  tends to a standard normal distribution.

Other functions of the chi-squared distribution converge more rapidly to a normal distribution. Some examples are:
 If  then  is approximately normally distributed with mean  and unit variance (1922, by R. A. Fisher, see (18.23), p. 426 of Johnson.
 If  then  is approximately normally distributed with mean  and variance  This is known as the Wilson–Hilferty transformation, see (18.24), p. 426 of Johnson.
This normalizing transformation leads directly to the commonly used median approximation  by back-transforming from the mean, which is also the median, of the normal distribution.

Related distributions 

 As ,  (normal distribution)
 (noncentral chi-squared distribution with non-centrality parameter )
If  then  has the chi-squared distribution 
As a special case, if  then  has the chi-squared distribution 
 (The squared norm of k standard normally distributed variables is a chi-squared distribution with k degrees of freedom)
(gamma distribution)
If  then  (chi distribution)
If , then  is an exponential distribution. (See gamma distribution for more.)
If , then  is an Erlang distribution.
If , then 
If  (Rayleigh distribution) then 
If  (Maxwell distribution) then 
If  then  (Inverse-chi-squared distribution)
The chi-squared distribution is a special case of type III Pearson distribution
If  (uniform distribution) then 
If  then 
 If  follows the generalized normal distribution (version 1) with parameters  then  
 chi-squared distribution is a transformation of Pareto distribution
 Student's t-distribution is a transformation of chi-squared distribution
 Student's t-distribution can be obtained from chi-squared distribution and normal distribution
 Noncentral beta distribution can be obtained as a transformation of chi-squared distribution and Noncentral chi-squared distribution
 Noncentral t-distribution can be obtained from normal distribution and chi-squared distribution

A chi-squared variable with  degrees of freedom is defined as the sum of the squares of  independent standard normal random variables.

If  is a -dimensional Gaussian random vector with mean vector  and rank  covariance matrix , then  is chi-squared distributed with  degrees of freedom.

The sum of squares of statistically independent unit-variance Gaussian variables which do not have mean zero yields a generalization of the chi-squared distribution called the noncentral chi-squared distribution.

The chi-squared distribution is also naturally related to other distributions arising from the Gaussian. In particular,

Generalizations 
The chi-squared distribution is obtained as the sum of the squares of  independent, zero-mean, unit-variance Gaussian random variables. Generalizations of this distribution can be obtained by summing the squares of other types of Gaussian random variables. Several such distributions are described below.

Linear combination 
It may be, however, approximated efficiently using the property of characteristic functions of chi-square random variables.

Chi-squared distributions

Noncentral chi-squared distribution 

The noncentral chi-squared distribution is obtained from the sum of the squares of independent Gaussian random variables having unit variance and nonzero means.

Generalized chi-squared distribution 

Gamma, exponential, and related distributions 
The chi-squared distribution  is a special case of the gamma distribution, in that  using the rate parameterization of the gamma distribution (or
 using the scale parameterization of the gamma distribution)
where  is an integer.

Because the exponential distribution is also a special case of the gamma distribution, we also have that if , then  is an exponential distribution.

The Erlang distribution is also a special case of the gamma distribution and thus we also have that if  with even , then  is Erlang distributed with shape parameter  and scale parameter .

Occurrence and applications 
The chi-squared distribution has numerous applications in inferential statistics, for instance in chi-squared tests and in estimating variances. It enters the problem of estimating the mean of a normally distributed population and the problem of estimating the slope of a regression line via its role in Student's t-distribution. It enters all analysis of variance problems via its role in the F-distribution, which is the distribution of the ratio of two independent chi-squared random variables, each divided by their respective degrees of freedom.

Following are some of the most common situations in which the chi-squared distribution arises from a Gaussian-distributed sample.

if  are i.i.d.  random variables, then  where .
The box below shows some statistics based on  independent random variables that have probability distributions related to the chi-squared distribution:

The chi-squared distribution is also often encountered in magnetic resonance imaging.

Computational methods

Table of χ2 values vs p-values 
The p-value is the probability of observing a test statistic at least as extreme in a chi-squared distribution. Accordingly, since the cumulative distribution function (CDF) for the appropriate degrees of freedom (df) gives the probability of having obtained a value less extreme than this point, subtracting the CDF value from 1 gives the p-value. A low p-value, below the chosen significance level, indicates statistical significance, i.e., sufficient evidence to reject the null hypothesis. A significance level of 0.05 is often used as the cutoff between significant and non-significant results.

History 
This distribution was first described by the German geodesist and statistician Friedrich Robert Helmert in papers of 1875–6, where he computed the sampling distribution of the sample variance of a normal population. Thus in German this was traditionally known as the Helmert'sche ("Helmertian") or "Helmert distribution".

The idea of a family of "chi-squared distributions", however, is not due to Pearson but arose as a further development due to Fisher in the 1920s.

See also 

 Chi distribution
 Scaled inverse chi-squared distribution
 Gamma distribution
 Generalized chi-squared distribution
 Noncentral chi-squared distribution
 Pearson's chi-squared test
 Reduced chi-squared statistic
 Wilks's lambda distribution

References

Further reading

External links 
Earliest Uses of Some of the Words of Mathematics: entry on Chi squared has a brief history
Course notes on Chi-Squared Goodness of Fit Testing from Yale University Stats 101 class.
Mathematica demonstration showing the chi-squared sampling distribution of various statistics, e. g. Σx², for a normal population
Simple algorithm for approximating cdf and inverse cdf for the chi-squared distribution with a pocket calculator
 Values of the Chi-squared distribution

Normal distribution
Infinitely divisible probability distributions